Dhananjoy Roy was a Member of the 1st National Assembly of Pakistan as a representative of East Pakistan.

Career
Roy was a Member of the Constituent Assembly of Pakistan. He was a prominent leader of the Scheduled Castes.

References

Pakistani MNAs 1947–1954
Living people
Year of birth missing (living people)
Members of the Constituent Assembly of Pakistan